SV Ratibor was a German association football club from the city of Ratibor, Upper Silesia (today Racibórz, Poland). It was the first football club established in Upper Silesia and remained active until 1945.

The club was established in 1903 by Fritz Seidl as Fußball Club Ratibor and in 1906 became part of the Upper Silesian division (Bezirk Oberschlesien) of the Southeast German Football Association. In 1911, the team took on the name Sportvereinigung Ratibor.

During the interwar period, Ratibor was in and out of regional first class competition with their best result coming as a second-place finish in 1931. In 1933, German football was reorganized under the Third Reich into sixteen top-flight divisions and Ratibor became part of the Gauliga Schlesien. SV'''s best finish (4th) came in the 1933–34 season, and just three campaigns later the team was relegated. They made a single appearance in the Tschammerpokal tournament, predecessor to today's DFB-Pokal (German Cup), in 1937. Ratibor'' returned to first division play in 1938 and later withdrew after playing just four matches of the 1939–40 Gauliga Oberschlesien (I) season when they could not field a team due to lack of players. The team disappeared with the end of World War II.

References

Das deutsche Fußball-Archiv historical German domestic league tables 

Football clubs in Germany
Defunct football clubs in Germany
Association football clubs established in 1903
Defunct football clubs in former German territories
1903 establishments in Germany
Association football clubs disestablished in 1945
1945 disestablishments in Germany
1945 disestablishments in Poland